Prismatoolithus is an oogenus of dinosaur egg from the Cretaceous (Hauterivian-Maastrichtian) and possibly also the earliest Paleocene. They likely belonged to troodontids

References 

Dinosaur reproduction
Egg fossils
Fossils of Canada
Paleontology in Alberta
Fossils of China
Fossils of France
Fossils of Japan
Fossils of Mexico
Fossils of Morocco
Fossils of Spain
Tremp Formation
Fossils of the United States
Paleontology in Montana
Paleontology in New Mexico
Paleontology in Utah
Milk River Formation
Fossil parataxa described in 1993